Life of Sethos, Taken from Private Memoirs of the Ancient Egyptians is an influential fantasy novel originally published in six volumes at Paris in 1731 by the French abbé Jean Terrasson. An English translation by Thomas Lediard published at London by J. Walthoe appeared in 1732.

According to classicist Mary Lefkowitz, Sethos:
{{quotation|purports to be a translation of an ancient manuscript found in the library of an unnamed foreign nation that is "extremely jealous of this sort of treasure." The author is said to have been an anonymous Greek in the second century A.D. Here Terrasson is following the conventions of ancient writers of historical fictions, such as the author of the Hermetica, who pretend that their works are translations of ancient writings that no one but themselves has seen. But Terrasson is careful not to deceive his readers completely: he assures them that the work he has "translated" for them is a fiction; .... He assures them that although fictional, the story keeps close to ancient sources, which, for the reader's convenience, he cites throughout the text. But he also says that "it is natural to suppose" that his author had access to original sources (now lost), such as memoirs available in the sacred archives of Egypt, written by unknown priests who accompanied Sethos on his travels. The sophisticated reader would be amused by the notion that the anonymous author had consulted these otherwise unknown documents, but Terrasson gives no warning to less well-educated readers that there is in fact no reason to "suppose" that these documents ever existed.|sign=|source=}}

See also
 Thamos, King of Egypt, an 18th-century play also set in ancient Egypt

References

External links
Tomes I and II of The Life of Sethos (French)
The Life of Sethos, Volume I in the 1732 (English translation)
1777 German translation of the Volume I of The Life of Sethos''
Séthos – Abbé Jean Terrasson, réédition (French)
Sethos, tragédie nouvelle dédiée au grand Corneille, by Alexandre Tanevot, 1740 tragedy inspired by Terrasson's novel


1731 novels
Novels set in ancient Egypt
18th-century French novels
Pseudohistory
Ancient Egypt in the Western imagination
Kings of Egypt in Herodotus
Afrocentrism